Krumbad is a traditional spa in Swabia, Germany with over 600 years tradition located at the foot of Alps.

History 
Hiltipold von Krumbenbach built a castle in 1145 on the mountain of today's Krumbades and named it after his name "Hiltipoldsburg", in the folk music "Hilpelsberg".  Hiltipoldsburg and Hürben (now the eastern part of Krumbach) came to the knights of Ellerbach some time later, who also brought Krumbach to themselves.

See also 
List of oldest companies
Krumbach, Bavaria

External links 
Homepage
Profile on Gesundes Bayern

Spa towns in Germany
Companies established in the 15th century
15th-century establishments in the Holy Roman Empire
Populated places in Günzburg (district)